Fatih Vatan Spor Kulübü is a women's football team based in Fatih, Istanbul. The team completed the 2016–17 season of Turkish Women's Second Football League as champion, and were promoted to the Turkish Women's First Football League.

History 
Fatih Vatan Spor was founded in 2006 as the sports club of Fatih Vatan High School, which is situated at Vatan Boulevard in Fatih district of Istanbul. The team finished the 2016–17 Women's Second League season following the play-off round as champion, and were promoted to the Women's First League.

Fatih Vatan Spor finished the 2018-19 First League in ninth place, and was relegated to the Second League after their second First League season.

Stadium 

The team play their home matches in Fatih Mimar Sinan Stadium.

Statistics 
.

 (1) Season stopped due to COVID-19 pandemic in Turkey
 (2) Finished Group as third, elimnated in the play-oss quarterfinals
 (3) Season in progress

Current squad 
.

Head coach:  Oğuz Katakaya

Kit history

Squads

References

External links 
 

 
Association football clubs established in 2006
2006 establishments in Turkey
Football clubs in Istanbul
Sport in Fatih